Patrick Cave (born October 1965) is a British novelist.

Biography 

Patrick Cave was born in Bath, England. He has tried his hand at many jobs and lived all over the place, from Athens to Peckham, mostly teaching English. He attended boarding school for seven years, during which he developed a love of music and of cross-country running and gained some spectacular exam failures. After obtaining his degree and a teaching certificate, he taught for ten years. Cave began writing books when faced with pressing financial need in the French countryside.  A Taoist by inclination, he also manages/sound-engineers in a live-music pub and lives on a boat. He has three children. He is currently training to become a healer.

Cave has always loved children's fiction, stating 'who could possibly understand the world better than children?'  He believes that his readers bring their own meaning to his books and with all the ingredients of excitement, suspense, catharsis, and escapism present in the story, there is no one "message". One of his favorite writers is K.M. Peyton.

He is concentrating on comedy writing at the moment.

Publications 
 Number 99
 Last Chance
 Sharp North
 Blown Away
 The Selected

Reception of works
Hephzibah Anderson of The Observer described Sharp North as 'a taught thriller...' and also that 'the novel frequently skids towards melodrama, but an atmospheric backdrop lends Cave's world a completeness that keeps it on track.'   Vivienne Dacosta of Serendipity Reviews found that 'The first fifty pages of this book were really a drag', but then 'the story took a different turn and I was completely hooked'.

Imogen Russell Williams of The Guardian talking of her enjoyment of 'reading fantasy and SF novels in which protagonists are playing for the biggest stake of all: their lives.', praised Blown Away as featuring 'one of the most inventive and difficult game sequences I've read.'  It was also shortlisted in The Guardian's 2006 children's fiction prize, where it was described as 'a thought-provoking novel about how individuals and societies survive when science creates new possibilities that threaten them.'

Kirkus concluded its review of The Selected by stating 'Constantly gripping, always fascinating and completely compelling', while Publishers Weekly said 'this can be read as a standalone novel, offering a potent message about confronting the chilling effects of abusive power'.

See also

References 

1965 births
Living people
English writers
English children's writers
English male writers